In military terms, 138th Division or 138th Infantry Division may refer to:

 138th Division (1st Formation)(People's Republic of China), 1948–1953
 138th Division (Imperial Japanese Army)
 138th Rifle Division (Soviet Union)